The EFL Young Player of the Month is an award for young players in all three divisions of the English Football League. To be eligible players must be under-21 or turn 21 during the current season. It was first awarded in December 2009. Victor Moses of Crystal Palace was the first winner.

List of winners

Awards won by division
Up to and including the February 2023 award.

Awards won by nationality
Up to and including the February 2023 award.

Awards won by club
Up to and including the February 2023 award.

Notes
4dtfd,fzsz

References

External links
Young Player of the Month Award at The Football League website

Association football player of the month awards
English Football League trophies and awards
Association football young player awards
Rookie player awards